The 2011–12 Elitserien season was the 37th season of Elitserien. The regular season began on 13 September 2011 and ended on 6 March 2012. The following playoffs began on 10 March 2012 and ended on 19 April. Färjestad BK were the defending Swedish Champions. Brynäs IF won their first Swedish Championship title since 1999, as well as their 13th in history, after defeating Skellefteå AIK in six games.

The regular season was won by Luleå HF, for the first time since 1996, while Djurgårdens IF and Timrå IK were forced to play in the 2012 Kvalserien for survival in the highest division.

In Kvalserien, Timrå IK requalified and Rögle BK qualified for the 2012–13 Elitserien season at the expense of Djurgårdens IF.

To allow for local music events as well as other ice hockey ones, this season had three mid-season breaks: the first between 8–14 November 2011, the second between 12–20 December, and the third between 5–14 February 2012. To increase interest for Elitserien, the 2011–12 season's schedule was more active: from 14–29 November 2011 and 16–31 January 2012, there were Elitserien games every day (except for two days, 20 November and 22 January). Also, in the playoffs, there were quarterfinals every day (the four quarterfinal series were split into two quarterfinals per day).

A significant change in this Elitserien season was that the clubs wouldn't be fined for supporter incidents as long as the clubs correctly followed the security rules.

On 17 October 2011, the Swedish Police Authority decided that the police should be economically compensated for their efforts during sports events held by joint-stock companies (JSC). This mainly affected the league's two Stockholm clubs Djurgårdens IF and AIK. As a result, AIK were forced to sell forward Linus Videll to Yugra Khanty-Mansiysk of the Kontinental Hockey League (KHL) on 24 October 2011.

Participating teams 

The local derby games between AIK and Djurgårdens IF were played in the Ericsson Globe, which has a capacity of 13,850 spectators.

Notable games 

The first game of the season was played on 13 September 2011 between Frölunda HC and the Elitserien newcomers Växjö Lakers. The game counted as round 6 and was won by Frölunda 2–0 in front of an outsold Scandinavium, with Frölunda defenceman Christian Bäckman scoring the first goal of the season.

The first Småland derby game in Elitserien history was played on 8 October 2011 between reigning regular-season champions HV71 and Växjö Lakers, at Kinnarps Arena in Jönköping. In front of a sold out Kinnarps Arena—exactly 7,000 spectators—Växjö Lakers came out with a 3–2 victory in a shootout. Växjö Lakers forward Mike Iggulden scored three penalty shot goals in the game, two of them counted in the statistics.

On 22 September 2011, Linköpings HC forward Mikael Håkanson played his 912th Elitserien game—regulation and playoff games included—and thus wrote history as he surpassed previous record holder Roger Åkerström. However, Skellefteå AIK wiped out Linköping in that game with a 4–0 shutout win.

On 23 November 2011, Linköpings HC forward Andreas Jämtin became the most penalized player in Elitserien history. He received a penalty of five minutes for elbowing and a match penalty after a hit on Luleå HF's Daniel Mannberg to reach a total of 1088 penalty minutes, surpassing Thomas Berglund's 1083.

Like the previous season, an outdoor game was played. It was played between HV71 and Linköpings HC (known as the E4 rivalry) on 10 December 2011, in a temporary arena at Elmia. The outdoor game was played as part of HV71 celebrating its 40th anniversary as a club. For the first time since the start of the yearly tradition of Elitserien outdoor games in 2009, the road team—this year Linköping—came out on top with a 1–0 overtime win in a tight game. 18,884 spectators attended the game, setting a new record for the most spectators at a single sports event in Jönköping; the previous record was 18,582 spectators, set at Stadsparksvallen in 1950.

3D broadcasting 
Certain chosen games were broadcast in 3D, marking the first time in history that Elitserien was broadcast in 3D. The local derby game on 20 September 2011, between Stockholm rivals Djurgårdens IF and AIK at the Ericsson Globe, was the first game to have a 3D broadcast. In front of a soldout Ericsson Globe, the game ended 4–2 in Djurgården's favour.

Pre-game honours
As a result of the 2011 Lokomotiv Yaroslavl plane crash, where Swedish former HV71 goaltender Stefan Liv and the entire Lokomotiv Yaroslavl team were killed, the premier round games between 13–15 September 2011 began with a one-minute silence. In honour of Stefan Liv, his No. 1 jersey was retired and raised to the rafters by HV71 in Kinnarps Arena prior to HV71's home game against Timrå IK on 10 January 2012.

Djurgårdens IF legend Sven Tumba died on 1 October 2011. As a result, Tumba was honoured in all Elitserien arenas that day. The biggest honours were held in Djurgården's home game against Växjö Lakers at Hovet, which was won by Djurgården 2–1.

On 24 January 2012, former five-time Djurgården Swedish champion Charles Berglund's No. 2 jersey was retired and raised to the rafters in Hovet prior to a game against Färjestad. Djurgården won 2–1 after a shootout.

Regular season

Standings

Statistics

Scoring leaders 
 
Updated as of the end of the regular season.
GP = Games played; G = Goals; A = Assists; Pts = Points; +/– = Plus/minus; PIM = Penalty minutes

Leading goaltenders 
These are the leaders in GAA among goaltenders who have played at least 40% of the team's minutes. Updated as of the end of the regular season.

GP = Games played; TOI = Time on ice (minutes); GA = Goals against; SO = Shutouts; Sv% = Save percentage; GAA = Goals against average

Attendance

Playoffs

Playoff bracket 
In the first round, the top-seeded team chose which of the four lowest remaining seeds to be matched against; the 2nd-seed chose any of the three remaining seeds; the 3rd-seed chose any of the two remaining seeds; and the 4th-seed was automatically matched against the remaining seed. In the second round, the highest remaining seed was matched against the lowest remaining seed, while two remaining seeds matched up against each other. In each round the higher-seeded team was awarded home ice advantage. Each best-of-seven series followed an alternating home team format: the higher-seeded team played at home for games 1 and 3 (plus 5 and 7 if necessary), and the lower-seeded team was at home for games 2 and 4 (plus 6 if necessary).

Quarterfinals

(1) Luleå HF vs. (7) AIK
Luleå entered the playoffs as the regular-season champions for the first time since 1996, with 100 points. AIK finished the regular season as the seventh seed with 82 points. This was the second playoff series between these teams; in 1997, Luleå defeated AIK in three games to advance to the finals. In the regular season, Luleå won four of the five games against AIK, allowing no goals in either of these four games.

(2) Skellefteå AIK vs. (8) Modo Hockey
Skellefteå finished second in the regular season with 95 points. Modo finished eighth and managed to qualify for the playoffs for the first time since 2007. The teams previously met in the 1978 semifinals, where Modo were swept in two games by Skellefteå. Skellefteå won all five games against Modo in the regular season, although each game was decided by only one goal.

(3) HV71 vs. (6) Färjestad BK
HV71 finished third with 92 points and failed to make the top two spots for the first time since 2009. Färjestad finished sixth with 87 points, marking the team's worst regular season since 2000. The teams had previously faced each other six times; HV71 had only come out on top once. The most recent meeting was in the 2009 finals, when Färjestad won in five games to become the Swedish Champions.

(4) Brynäs IF vs. (5) Frölunda HC
Brynäs' fourth-place finish in the regular season was the team's best since 2001. Frölunda finished fifth and made their best regular season since 2009. This was the fifth playoff series between the teams; the two most recent ones had been won by Frölunda. The previous meeting occurred in 2006, when Frölunda swept Brynäs in four games to advance to the semifinals.

Semifinals 
All times are local (UTC+2).

(2) Skellefteå AIK vs. (7) AIK
Skellefteå won four of the five regular-season meetings against AIK, only one of which was decided by more than one goal. In the playoffs, the teams had previously faced each other in the 1978 finals; Skellefteå came out on top and clinched the championship in three games that time.
{{NHLPlayoffs
|team1=Skellefteå AIK
|team2=AIK
|stadium1=Skellefteå Kraft Arena
|stadium2=Hovet
|date1=March 26
|score1=1–4
|recap1=hockeyligan.se/elitserien-arena/38066/
|won1=2
|1-1-1=No scoring
|1-3-1=Bud Holloway 5 - pp - 10:41
|1-3-2=02:23 - Josh MacNevin 2  13:11 - Daniel Bång 2  16:10 - Kent McDonell 3  19:21 - en - Tobias Viklund 1
|goalie1-1=Joacim Eriksson 34 saves / 37 shots
|goalie1-2=Viktor Fasth 39 saves / 40 shots
|date2=March 28
|home2=2
|score2=4–5
|won2=1
|ot2=3
|recap2=hockeyligan.se/elitserien-arena/38068/
|2-1-1=19:32 - Joakim Lindström 2
|2-1-2=Richard Gynge 1–01:30  Johannes Salmonsson 2–06:08
|2-2-1=05:25 - Oscar Möller 2  12:23 - ps - Oscar Möller 3
|2-2-2=Christian Sandberg 3 - pp - 13:01
|2-3-1=12:33 - Jimmie Ericsson 4
|2-3-2=Stefan Johansson 2 - pp - 09:17
|2-4-1=10:49 - pp - Jimmie Ericsson 5
|goalie2-1=Joacim Eriksson 43 saves / 47 shots
|goalie2-2=Viktor Fasth 59 saves / 64 shots
|date3=March 30
|home3=1
|score3=5–1
|won3=1
|recap3=hockeyligan.se/elitserien-arena/38070/
|3-1-1=No scoring|3-2-1=Melker Karlsson 1–11:38  Oscar Möller 4 - ps - 19:31
|3-3-1=Lee Goren 1 - pp - 03:08  Lee Goren 2 - pp - 06:07  Lee Goren 3 - en - 17:47
|3-3-2=09:58 - sh - Joakim Nordström 1
|goalie3-1=Joacim Eriksson 24 saves / 25 shots
|goalie3-2=Viktor Fasth 35 saves / 39 shots  Markus Svensson 8 saves / 8 shots
|date4=April 1
|home4=2
|score4=5–3
|won4=2
|recap4=hockeyligan.se/elitserien-arena/38073/
|4-1-1=07:12 - pp - Oscar Möller 5
|4-1-2=Dick Tärnström 2 - pp - 04:28  Johannes Salmonsson 3–05:00
|4-2-1=06:50 - Pierre-Édouard Bellemare 2  11:49 - Bud Holloway 6
|4-2-2=Kent McDonell 4–05:17
|4-3-2=Robert Rosén 1 - pp - 15:28  Daniel Rudslätt 2 - pp - 18:44
|goalie4-1=Joacim Eriksson 30 saves / 35 shots
|goalie4-2=Viktor Fasth 23 saves / 26 shots
|date5=April 3
|home5=1
|score5=8–2
|won5=1
|recap5=hockeyligan.se/elitserien-arena/38074/
|5-1-1=Lee Goren 4–03:36  Joakim Lindström 3–06:29  Jimmie Ericsson 6 - pp - 11:28  Bud Holloway 7–18:01
|5-2-1=Erik Forssell 2 - pp - 13:03
|5-2-2=02:59 - sh - Christian Sandberg 4  18:04 - Kent McDonell 5
|5-3-1=Anders Söderberg 1–04:48  Christian Söderström 2 - pp - 13:10  Melker Karlsson 2–13:44
|goalie5-1=Joacim Eriksson 17 saves / 19 shots
|goalie5-2=Viktor Fasth 42 saves / 50 shots
|date6=April 5
|home6=2
|score6=2–1
|won6=2
|recap6=hockeyligan.se/index.php/elitserien-arena/38076/
|6-1-1=No scoring|6-2-2=Robert Rosén 2 - pp - 13:04
|6-3-1=06:23 - pp - Bud Holloway 8
|6-3-2=Robert Rosén 3–03:21
|goalie6-1=Joacim Eriksson 22 saves / 24 shots
|goalie6-2=Viktor Fasth 39 saves / 40 shots
|date7=April 7
|home7=1
|score7=5–3
|won7=1
|recap7=hockeyligan.se/elitserien-arena/38078/
|7-1-1=Jimmie Ericsson 7 - pp - 10:56  Johan Forsberg 1–14:21
|7-1-2=19:14 - Kent McDonell 6
|7-2-1=Oscar Möller 6 - pp - 05:32
|7-3-1=Christian Söderström 3 - pp - 01:35  Lee Goren 5 - en - 16:48
|7-3-2=09:11 - pp - Tobias Viklund 2  19:43 - sh - Daniel Bång 3
|goalie7-1=Joacim Eriksson 21 saves / 24 shots
|goalie7-2=Viktor Fasth 26 saves / 30 shots
|series=Skellefteå AIK won series 4–3
}}

(4) Brynäs IF vs. (6) Färjestad BK
Brynäs won three of the five regular-season games against Färjestad. The teams had previously met each other in the playoffs eight times; Färjestad had come out on top in the six latest occasions. The most recent meeting occurred in 2011, when Färjestad knocked Brynäs out in the quarterfinals, winning in five games.

 Finals 

(2) Skellefteå AIK vs. (4) Brynäs IF
Brynäs won three of the five regular-season games between the two teams. This was only the second playoff series between these teams. The first playoff meeting took place in the 1976 semifinals, when Brynäs defeated Skellefteå two games to zero and advanced to the finals.

 Playoff statistics 

 Playoff scoring leaders 
 
Updated as of 19 April 2012.GP = Games played; G = Goals; A = Assists; Pts = Points; +/– = Plus/minus; PIM = Penalty minutes Playoff leading goaltenders 
These are the leaders in GAA and save percentage among goaltenders who played at least 40% of the team's minutes. The table is sorted by GAA, and the criteria for inclusion are bolded. Updated as of the end of the season.GP = Games played; TOI = Time on ice (minutes); GA = Goals against; SO = Shutouts; Sv% = Save percentage; GAA = Goals against average''

Elitserien awards

Suspensions and fines

References

External links

 
1
Swedish Hockey League seasons
Swe